Markus Søberg (born 22 April 1995) is a Norwegian professional ice hockey right winger. He is currently playing for Stavanger Oilers in the Norwegian Eliteserien (Norway).

He was drafted by the Columbus Blue Jackets in the sixth round (165th overall) of the 2013 NHL Entry Draft.

Hailing from Oslo, he is a brother of Steffen Søberg.

Playing career 
After playing Junior Hockey in Sweden and Canada, Søberg returned home, signing for Vålerenga midway through the 2015–16 season. Before the 2016–17 season, he was picked up by defending champions Stavanger Oilers.

Career statistics

Regular season and playoffs

International

References

External links

1995 births
Living people
Columbus Blue Jackets draft picks
Frölunda HC players
HK Poprad players
Norwegian expatriate sportspeople in Sweden
Norwegian expatriate sportspeople in Canada
Norwegian ice hockey right wingers
Ice hockey people from Oslo
Stavanger Oilers players
Vålerenga Ishockey players
Windsor Spitfires players
Norwegian expatriate ice hockey people
Norwegian expatriate sportspeople in Slovakia
Expatriate ice hockey players in Sweden
Expatriate ice hockey players in Slovakia
Expatriate ice hockey players in Canada